Cho Hye-jung (born December 22, 1992) is a South Korean actress. She is known for her role in 2017 TV series Weightlifting Fairy Kim Bok-joo.

Early life and education 
Cho was born to Cho Jae-hyun and his college sweetheart on December 22, 1992. She has a brother, Cho Soo-hoon, a short-track speed skater who is three years older. Cho attended the American Academy of Dramatic Arts in New York.

Career 
On April 10, 2017, Cho signed with Jellyfish Entertainment.

Due to her father's admission of sexual misconduct, Cho went on hiatus from 2018 until her comeback in 2022 with Our Blues.

Filmography

Films

Television series

Television programs

References 

South Korean television actresses
South Korean film actresses
21st-century South Korean actresses
1992 births
Living people